The Welding Institute (TWI Ltd) is a research and technology organisation, with a specialty in welding. It has had headquarters near Cambridge, England, since 1946, and has other facilities across the UK and around the world. TWI works across all industry sectors and in all aspects of manufacturing, fabrication and whole-life integrity management technologies.

TWI services include consultancy, technical advice, research and investigation for industrial member companies and public funding bodies. It also offers training and examination services in NDT, welding and inspection across the globe.

Employing over 800 staff, TWI serves 700 industrial member companies across 4500 sites in 80 countries. The formation in 1922 of its professional institution, The Welding Institute, and the later establishment of the British Welding Research Association (BWRA) in 1946 provided the basis of the company group as it is today. The Welding Institute currently has a separate membership of over 6000 individuals.

Friction stir welding was invented by TWI in 1991.

Structure

The professional division of TWI is a licensed member of the Engineering Council. It is situated at Granta Park, near Duxford Museum.

Both industrial and professional members are represented on the Council that oversees TWI's business and the operational activities.

UK and overseas operations

 TWI headquarters at Granta Park, Cambridgeshire 
 TWI Technology Centre (North East), set up in 1992 in north-west Middlesbrough.
 TWI Technology Centre (Yorkshire), on the Waverley Business Park in Catcliffe.
 TWI NDT Validation Centre (Wales), at Harbourside Business Park, Port Talbot, in south Wales
 TWI Aberdeen  in north-west Aberdeen

The organisation has international branches in Australia, Bahrain, Canada, China, India, Indonesia, Malaysia, Pakistan, Thailand, Turkey, United Arab Emirates and North America.

History

Earlier institution
The Welding Institute (TWI Professional Group) is a direct descendant of the Institution of Welding Engineers Limited, which began when 20 men gathered on 26 January 1922 in the Holborn Restaurant in London and resolved to establish an association to bring together acetylene welders and those interested in electric arc welding. The date of registration under the Companies Act was 15 February 1923.  Slow growth over the next ten years saw membership grow to 600 with an income of £800 per annum.

Formation

In April 1934, the Institution merged with the British Advisory Welding Council to form a new organisation – the Institute of Welding.  A symposium that same year, Welding of Iron and Steel, held in conjunction with the Iron and Steel Institute, showed the need for a research programme.  It took the threat of war, the Welding Research Council and modest funding from the Department of Scientific and Industrial Research (DSIR), to generate the will and ability to commence such a programme in 1937. The Institute had no laboratories of its own and supported work, mainly in UK universities.

Research association
In the late 1940s, a move was made to transform the Welding Research Council to the recently established status of Research Association, thereby giving it access to DSIR funding in proportion to that raised from industry. At the time, professional institutions were debarred from acting as Research Associations so the establishment of the British Welding Research Association (BWRA) in 1946 forced separation from the Institute.

Cambridgeshire
BWRA bought Abington Hall, near Cambridge, UK, a country house and grounds in poor repair, for £3850 and commenced business under Allan Ramsay Moon as its director of research.  The first welding shop was established in stables adjoining the house, and fatigue research commenced under Dr. Richard Weck.

BWRA also occupied a house in London, 29 Park Crescent, which it converted into a metallurgical laboratory, with the butler's pantry becoming the polishing room and the coachman's quarters, the machine shop.

Ramsay Moon left after one year, disillusioned at the grant of only £30,000 from DSIR, and it fell to Dr. Harry Taylor to grow the organisation into a viable business.

Academic programmes
The Institute of Welding had bought property in London very close to the Imperial College of Science and Technology.  It ran an expanding training programme through its School of Welding Technology and later the School of Non Destructive Testing.

Merger
In 1957, Richard Weck, became Director of BWRA. The 1960s saw significant growth in the size and scope of BWRA, including its involvement in training. In general, these activities complemented those of the Institute of Welding but it became apparent that the two organisations would serve industry better by merging. The successor to DSIR, the Ministry of Technology, put forward no objection so a merger was agreed and a new body – The Welding Institute – was created on 28 March 1968.

Withdrawal of government funds
Direct support from Government departments ceased in the 1970s but TWI not only survived this funding crisis but grew rapidly. The original individual professional membership envisaged in 1922 developed into a body of more than 7000 engineers.

Expansion worldwide
In 1988 Bevan Braithwaite was appointed as chief executive of The Welding Institute. By 2008, the organisation had opened offices and laboratories at three further sites within the UK (in Middlesbrough, Port Talbot and the Advanced Manufacturing Park, South Yorkshire) and operated facilities in the North America, China, Southeast Asia, India and the Middle East.

In 2012, it launched the National Structural Integrity Research Centre (NSIRC) for postgraduate education.

By 2015, TWI had established a further UK base in Aberdeen and 12 international branches.

In 2016, TWI formed the Tipper Group—" a group designed especially for women in the engineering profession." It aims to support and inspire female engineers in welding, joining and associated technologies.

In February 2019, Aamir Khalid was appointed Chief Executive of TWI (the successor to Christoph Wiesner).

See also
 International Institute of Welding

References

External links 
 TWI Ltd
 The Welding Institute
 TWI Training
 TWI Software
 TWI Certification
 TWI Innovation Network
 The National Structural Integrity Research Centre
 Friction Stir Welding
 Engineering Consultancy Services

Welding organizations
Professional associations based in the United Kingdom
ECUK Licensed Members
Research institutes in Cambridgeshire
South Cambridgeshire District
Organisations based in Cambridgeshire
Organizations established in 1968
1968 establishments in England
Technology companies of England
Engineering consulting firms of the United Kingdom
Research organisations in England